Aas or AAS may refer to:

 Aas (surname)
 Aas, Pyrénées-Atlantiques, a village in France

Companies 
Ateliers Aéronautiques de Suresnes, a defunct French aircraft manufacturing company
Alcatel Alenia Space, an aerospace company; now Thales Alenia Space
 Austin American-Statesman, a Texas newspaper
Austrian Air Services, a defunct airline from Austria (ICAO designator)

Organizations
 African Academy of Sciences , an Africa-wide scientific organization
 Air Ambulance Service, a UK charity
 All-America Selections, an organization that promotes development of new garden seed varieties
 American Antiquarian Society, an American society and national research library
 American Anti-Slavery Society
 American Arachnological Society, a society of amateur and professional arachnologists
 American Association of Suicidology, an American nonprofit suicide prevention organization
 American Astronautical Society, an independent scientific and technical group in the United States
 American Astronomical Society, a United States society of professional astronomers
 Ansar al-Sunna, or Jamaat Ansar al-Sunna, a militant group operating in Iraq
 Arnold Air Society, a professional honorary service organization for US Air Force officer candidates
 Association for Academic Surgery
 Association for Asian Studies
 Assyrian Academic Society
 Assyrian Aid Society
 Australian Academy of Science, an independent, government-endorsed society with the aim of promoting science
 Australian Anthropological Society

In business 
 As a service, a business model that allows companies to either outsource certain functions, or avoid purchasing certain goods
 Audit and Assurance Standards issued by ICAI, the Institute of Chartered Accountants of India

In science, mathematics, and technology
 Asymptotically almost surely
 Angle-Angle-Side, see congruence (geometry)
 Atomic absorption spectroscopy, for quantitative determination of chemical elements
 ASCII Adjust after Subtraction, an x86 Intel BCD opcode

In medicine
 Acute aortic syndrome
 Anabolic–androgenic steroid, or simply anabolic steroid

Other uses
A.a.s (art group), a British-based art collective
Acta Apostolicae Sedis, the official commentary of the Holy See/Vatican City State
Apalapsili Airport in Apalapsili, Indonesia, IATA code
Armed Aerial Scout a U.S. Army replacement program for the OH-58 Kiowa
Asa language, an extinct language of Tanzania, ISO 639-3 code
Associate of Applied Science, a college degree
Taylor County Airport (Kentucky), Campbellsville, US, FAA LID
Sony Auto-lock Accessory Shoe, on camera
Abandon All Ships, an Italian-Canadian metalcore band from Toronto, Ontario
Anglo-American School of Moscow
Anglo-American School of Sofia
Aas (TV series), a Pakistani television series